Karnavati may also refer to:
 Ahmedabad, Gujarat, India
 Karnavati University (KU), Uvarsad, Gujarat, India
 Rani Karnavati (died 1535), a princess and temporary ruler from Bundi, India
 Rani Karnavati of Garhwal (17th century), ruled the Garhwal Kingdom as regent